Burke Centre station is a railway station in Burke Centre, Burke, Fairfax County, Virginia. It is served by the Virginia Railway Express Manassas Line, as well as one daily Amtrak Northeast Regional round trip.

History

The station opened along with the Manassas Line on June 22, 1992. A large parking garage and bus stands were added in mid-2008 as a $28 million project.

On October 1, 2009, one Amtrak Northeast Regional round trip was extended to Lynchburg. As with Northeast Regional trains on the Fredericksburg Line, trains would stop for VRE passengers under a cross-honoring agreement between Amtrak and VRE. On January 18, 2010, Burke Centre became a full Amtrak stop, with passengers allowed to book travel to and from the station in both directions. Amtrak Cardinal and Crescent trains pass through but do not stop.

References

External links 

Burke Centre VRE Station

Transportation in Fairfax County, Virginia
Virginia Railway Express stations
Amtrak stations in Virginia
Railway stations in the United States opened in 1992
1992 establishments in Virginia
Buildings and structures in Fairfax County, Virginia